Shen Yinhao (born 1986) is a Chinese football referee. He has been a full international referee for FIFA since 2018.

References 

Chinese football referees
Living people
1986 births
Sportspeople from Shanghai